The second season of the Hungarian television music talent show X-Faktor ended on 18 December 2011. Tibor Kocsis was announced as the winner. It was broadcast on the privately owned RTL Klub television station.

Auditions

Auditions started in spring 2011, with thousands of candidates.

Bootcamp

Bootcamp was in Thalia Theatre where 150 singers competed. In the first round the contestants sang a song of their choice. The judges immediately told the contestants if they were safe or not. In the second round only 50 contestants competed and they chose a song for themselves from a list. After this, based on the judges decision, 24 contestants went to the third round called "Judges' houses".

Judges' houses

At this stage of the competition, each judge mentored six acts. Each judge had help from a guest judge to choose their final acts.
Keresztes was helped by László Kicska, Malek by Gabriella Tóth, Nagy by Kati Wolf and Geszti by Béla Patkó. Contestants performed one song for their respective judge. Each judge and their guest eliminated three acts, leaving twelve remaining. The judges' houses stage was broadcast in two episodes on 8 and 9 October 2011.

The twelve eliminated acts were:
Boys: Barna Gergely, Attila Oltyán, Arnold Tarsoly
Girls: Blanka Abodi-Nagy, Éva Farkas, Petra Gubik
Over 25s: András Géczi, Violetta Borzné Kovács, Beuka Luther 
Groups: Angler Balázs and Simon Boglárka, Szilvia Csótó and Kitti Berta, Tamás Czékmány and Hajnalka Wunderli

Contestants

Key:
 – Winner
 – Runner-up
 – Third Place

Results summary

{|
|-
| – mentored by Feró Nagy (Girls)
|| – Bottom two
|-
| – mentored by Ildikó Keresztes (Boys)
| – Most public votes  that week
|-
| – mentored by Péter Geszti  (Groups)
|-
| – mentored by Miklós Malek  (Over 25s)
|}

Live Shows

Week 1 (15 October)

Theme: Musical role models
Celebrity performer: Csaba Vastag ("Szállj!")
Group performance: "Egy másik nemzedék"

Judge's vote to eliminate
 Nagy: Tibor Gyurcsík
 Malek: Rocktenors
 Keresztes: Rocktenors
 Geszti: Tibor Gyurcsík

As both Acts got 2 Votes, they went to deadlock and Tibor Gyurcsík was eliminated.

Week 2 (22 October)

Theme: Love songs
Celebrity performer: Gabi Tóth ("Jöjj még")
Group performance: "Tevagyazakitalegjobban"

Judge's vote to eliminate
 Geszti: Lil C
 Malek: Tamás Demes
 Keresztes: Tamás Demes
 Nagy: Tamás Demes

Week 3 (29 October)

Theme: Rock 
Celebrity performer: Veca Janicsák ("Labirintus")
Group performance: "Salalla"

Judge's vote to eliminate
 Malek: Ikrek
 Geszti: Ikrek
 Nagy: Rocktenors
 Keresztes: Ikrek

Week 4 (5 November)

Theme: Cover Songs
Celebrity performer: Ary Bery ("A szavak eltalálnak ") and Vanilla Ágnes ("Ne higgy nekem")
Group performance: "Szabadulj fel"

Judge's vote to eliminate
 Malek: Apollo23
 Geszti: Rocktenors
 Nagy: Apollo23
 Keresztes: Rocktenors

As both Acts got 2 Votes, they went to deadlock and Apollo23 were eliminated.

Week 5 (12 November)

Theme: Award-winning songs
Celebrity performer: Kati Wolf ("Vár a holnap)")
Group performance: "Sorskerék"

Judge's vote to eliminate
 Keresztes: Alexa Bagosi
 Malek: Alexa Bagosi
 Nagy: Lil C
 Geszti: Alexa Bagosi

Week 6 (19 November)

Theme: Current party songs
Celebrity performer: The Carbonfools ("Hideaway") and Fluor ("Mizu" / "Lájk" / "Halenda")
Group performance: "A zenétől felforr a vérem"

Judge's vote to eliminate
 Geszti: Tibor Kocsis
 Keresztes: Tibor Kocsis
 Malek: Lil C
 Nagy: Lil C

As both Acts got 2 Votes, they went to deadlock and Lil C was eliminated.

Week 7 (26 November)

Theme: Weather-themed songs
Celebrity performer: Norbi L. Király ("Valahol elveszett")
Group performance: "Az én órám másképp jár"

Judge's vote to eliminate
 Keresztes: Rocktenors
 Nagy: Rocktenors
 Malek: Rocktenors
 Geszti: Tamás Tarány

Week 8 (3 December)

Theme: One English song & One Hungarian song
Celebrity performer: Aurea and Nikolas Takács ("Where Is The Love")
Group performance: "Careless Whisper" and "Sosem vagy egyedül"

Judge's vote to eliminate
 Keresztes: Vera Kováts
 Nagy: Gergő Baricz
 Geszti: Vera Kováts
 Malek: Gergő Baricz

As both Acts got 2 Votes, they went to deadlock and Vera Kováts was eliminated.

Week 9 (10 December)

Theme: One English song & One Hungarian song
Celebrity performer: Anti Fitness Club, Anna Pásztor and Jonny K. Palmer ("Moves like Jagger"/"Satisfaction") and Ádám Szabó ("Magyarország")
Group performance: "Vidéki sanzon"

Judge's vote to eliminate
 Geszti: Enikő Muri
 Nagy: Tamás Tarány
 Malek: Enikő Muri
 Keresztes: Tamás Tarány

As both Acts got 2 Votes, they went to deadlock and Tamás Tarány was eliminated.

Week 10 (17 December)

Saturday Night 

Theme: One chosen as the judges' favourite, one with a surprise duet partner, one song performed on the audition,
Duets:
Gergő Baricz and KFT
Enikő Muri and Attila Dolhai
Tibor Kocsis and Zséda

Sunday Night 

Theme: Finalist's favourite previously performed song, Christmas, Winner Song

External links
Official website (in Hungarian)

Hungary 02
Hungarian television shows
2011 Hungarian television series debuts
2011 Hungarian television series endings
2010s Hungarian television series
2011 Hungarian television seasons